Serrurier derives from serrurier which means locksmith in French.

Serrurier is a surname and may refer to:

 Pierre Serrurier - Dutch millenarian theologian
 Doug Serrurier - South African racing driver and racing car constructor
 Mark U. Serrurier - American engineer who designed the Serrurier truss
 Auguste Serrurier - French competitor in the sport of archery
 Mark Serrurier - son of Dutch-born electrical engineer, Iwan Serrurier
 Iwan Serrurier - Dutch-born electrical engineer notable for inventing the Moviola
 Louis Serrurier - South African cricketer
 Gustave Serrurier-Bovy - Belgian architect and furniture designer

References

External links
Distribution of the surname Serrurier in France

French-language surnames
Occupational surnames